Sir James Wilson Robertson,  (27 October 189923 September 1983) was a British civil servant who served as the last colonial governor-general of Nigeria from 1955 to 1960.

Early life and education 
He was educated at Merchiston Castle School in Edinburgh and Balliol College, Oxford. He served a Commission in the British Army with the Gordon Highlanders and the Black Watch. He received an honorary Doctor of Laws degree (LL.D.) from the University of Leeds in 1961.

Career 
After Oxford he joined the Sudan Political Service from 1922 to 1953, serving appointments in Blue Nile, White Nile, Fung, and Kordofan provinces and was the Civil Secretary from 1945 to 1953. In this position in 1947 he was chairman of the Juba Conference. He was then sent to British Guiana in January 1954 by Oliver Lyttelton, the then-Secretary of State for the Colonies to write the Robertson Commission Report to investigate the current crisis in the country due to the election of the People's Progressive Party, who were seen as too friendly with the Communist organisations that had led to the suspension of the constitution.

He was then sent to Nigeria as a result of his good work. He was Governor-General from 15 June 1955 to 16 November 1960 (representing the Queen as head of state from 1 October to 16 November 1960).

Family
His brother was Ian Robertson, Lord Robertson, whose daughter Sally married Nick Kuenssberg . His great-niece Laura Kuenssberg is a journalist. His first wife was Anne Mueller.

Writings
Roberston wrote a memoir, Transition in Africa: From Direct Rule to Independence, published by Hurst, London, in 1974, that reflects on his nearly 40 years in Africa. It provides detail on both his administrative life and personal observations. In a final chapter, "Reflections", he accounts the swift collapse and disintegration of so much of what he and his fellow British servants of the Empire had constructed not only in the Sudan and Nigeria, but in all of Britain's former colonial African territories. Commenting on foreign concern about post-independence difficulties, he observed: "Americans have asked me: 'Why did you leave so soon, before the colonial territories were ready to rule themselves?' And when I have answered, 'Partly, I am sure, because of your pressure on us to go,' [they] have answered that they did not know then what they know now, and that we should have resisted their pressure." (p. 253)

Robertson made a notable contribution to a 1978 Oxford Symposium, Transfer of Power: the Colonial Administrator in the Age of De-colonisation, edited by A. H. M. Kirk-Greene (published, in 1979, by the Inter-Faculty Committee for African Studies, Oxford University), particularly his "The Governor as the Man in the Middle", (pp. 38–43); and "Summary of Discussion", (pp. 50–59). The Last of the Proconsuls: Letters of Sir James Robertson, edited by Graham F. Thomas, was published in 1994. It is a collection of letters Robertson sent to Thomas over 40 years mainly about the problems towards the end of the British Empire.

Styles

1899 – 3 June 1931: James Wilson Robertson
3 June 1931 – 1940: James Wilson Robertson MBE
1940–1941: His Excellency James Wilson Robertson MBE, Governor of Gezira Province
1941 – 1 January 1948: James Wilson Robertson MBE
1 January 1948 – 1 June 1953: Sir James Wilson Robertson KBE
1 June 1953 – 15 June 1955: Sir James Wilson Robertson KCMG, KBE
15 June 1955 – 1956: His Excellency Sir James Wilson Robertson KCMG, KBE, Governor-General and Commander-in-Chief, Federation of Nigeria
1956 – 13 June 1957: His Excellency Sir James Wilson Robertson GCVO, KCMG, KBE, Governor-General and Commander-in-Chief, Federation of Nigeria
13 June 1957 – 1 October 1960: His Excellency Sir James Wilson Robertson GCMG, GCVO, KBE, Governor-General and Commander-in-Chief, Federation of Nigeria
1 October – 16 November 1960: His Excellency Sir James Wilson Robertson GCMG, GCVO, KBE, Governor-General and Commander-in-Chief of the Independent Federation of Nigeria
16 November 1960 – 1965: Sir James Wilson Robertson GCMG, GCVO, KBE
1965–1983: Sir James Wilson Robertson KT, GCMG, GCVO, KBE

References

External links 
 

Knights Commander of the Order of the British Empire
Knights Grand Cross of the Order of St Michael and St George
Knights Grand Cross of the Royal Victorian Order
Knights of the Thistle
Alumni of Balliol College, Oxford
People educated at Merchiston Castle School
1899 births
1983 deaths
British Governors and Governors-General of Nigeria
Sudan Political Service officers